Caissa may refer to:
 Caïssa, a mythical Thracian dryad portrayed as the goddess of chess
 Caissa (moth), a moth genus in the family Limacodidae
 Caissa Capital, a hedge fund based on volatility arbitrage in the late 1990s